Nubya Nyasha Garcia (born 1991) is an English jazz musician, saxophonist, composer and bandleader.

Early life and education
Garcia was born in 1991 in Camden Town, London, the youngest of four siblings, to a Guyanese mother, a former civil servant, and a British Trinidadian filmmaker father.

Garcia followed her three older siblings to the local Camden Saturday Music Centre at the age of 5, where she first learned the violin and later played the viola in the London Schools Symphony Orchestra (LSSO). Garcia's upbringing by her stepdad, a brass player, and music loving mother, coupled with the music activities at Camden School for Girls, meant she was exposed to multiple genres of music.

Garcia began learning the saxophone at the age of 10, with Vicky Wright. She became a member of the Camden Jazz Band, directed by jazz pianist Nikki Yeoh, before joining the junior jazz program at the Royal Academy of Music. She attended the youth music workshops at the  Roundhouse in Camden and also with Tomorrow's Warriors under the direction of Gary Crosby. While still in high school, she received a scholarship for a five-week summer program at the Berklee College of Music in Boston. During her gap year she studied with former Jazz Messengers member Jean Toussaint. In 2016 she graduated with honours from the Trinity Laban Conservatoire of Music and Dance, in Jazz Performance.

Career
In 2017, Garcia released her debut EP Nubya's 5ive via the label Jazz re:freshed. That year, her band was an opening act at Gilles Peterson's Worldwide Festival in Sète; the following year she played at the NYC Winter Jazz Festival and the JazzFest Berlin.

In her 2018 EP When We Are, Garcia explored how electronics can be used in a live jazz environment; the EP was created with the support of the Steve Reid InNOVAtion Award, a development project between PRS Foundation and Steve Reid Foundation. She is also a member of the collective Nérija and the Afro-jazz ensemble Maisha.

Garcia has performed at festivals in the UK including Love Supreme Jazz Festival and NN North Sea Jazz Festival. She has headlined sell-out shows at Ronnie Scott's Jazz Club. Since November 2017 Garcia has held monthly radio residency as a DJ on NTS Radio.

Garcia was supposed to perform at the 2020 Glastonbury Festival, which had to be cancelled due to the COVID-19 pandemic.  In June 2022 Nubya Garcia debuted her band on the West Holt stage at Glastonbury Festival.

Garcia released her debut studio album Source in August 2020 by Concord Jazz. The album was listed on several end of 2020 top album lists.  In July 2021 the album Source was shortlisted for the 2021 Hyundai Mercury Prize.

Nubya Garcia debuted her band on 18 August at the 2021 BBC Proms held in London's Royal Albert Hall. The Daily Telegraph gave the performance a 5* review.

In December 2020, Garcia joined a band of British jazz musicians to play on the Bitches Brew-inspired, self-titled album London Brew, which is set for release on 31 March 2023 by Concord Jazz.

Musical influences
Nubya Garcia has cited the prominent jazz saxophonists Dexter Gordon, Sonny Rollins and John Coltrane, as well as trumpeter Miles Davis and pianist-composer Mary Lou Williams, as her 'musical heroes'. She included Steel Pulse, a UK based reggae band from Birmingham amongst her musical inspirations.

Charitable work
Nubya Garcia is a Patron of the Camden Music Trust.

Awards and nominations

Discography 

 Nubya's 5ive EP (2017)
 When We Are EP (2018)
 "Pace" single (2020)
 "Source" single (2020)
 Source album (2020)

References

External links

 

 Biography
 Bandcamp-Artist's Page
 BBC Music introducing
 Guardian profile

People from Camden Town
English jazz saxophonists
Women jazz saxophonists
Musicians from London
Living people
People educated at Camden School for Girls
1991 births
English people of Guyanese descent
English people of Trinidad and Tobago descent
Alumni of Trinity College of Music